John Wood Campbell Jr. (June 8, 1910 – July 11, 1971) was an American science fiction writer and editor. He was editor of Astounding Science Fiction (later called Analog Science Fiction and Fact) from late 1937 until his death and was part of the Golden Age of Science Fiction. Campbell wrote super-science space opera under his own name and stories under his primary pseudonym, Don A. Stuart. Campbell also used the pen names Karl Van Kampen and Arthur McCann. His novella Who Goes There? was adapted as the films The Thing from Another World (1951), The Thing (1982), and The Thing (2011).

Campbell began writing science fiction at age 18 while attending MIT. He published six short stories, one novel, and six letters in the science fiction magazine Amazing Stories from 1930 to 1931. This work established Campbell's reputation as a writer of space adventure. When in 1934 he began to write stories with a different tone, he wrote as Don A. Stuart. From 1930 until the later part of that decade, Campbell was prolific and successful under both names, though he stopped writing fiction shortly after he became editor of Astounding in 1937.

It is as editor of Astounding Science Fiction from late 1937 until his death for which Campbell is primarily remembered today. In 1939, Campbell started the fantasy magazine Unknown, which was canceled after only four years.  Referring to his time spent as an editor, The Encyclopedia of Science Fiction states: "More than any other individual, he helped to shape modern sf." Isaac Asimov called Campbell "the most powerful force in science fiction ever" and said the "first ten years of his editorship he dominated the field completely." In his capacity as an editor, Campbell published some of the very earliest work, and helped shape the careers of virtually every important science-fiction author to debut between 1938 and 1946, including Asimov, Robert A. Heinlein, Theodore Sturgeon, and Arthur C. Clarke.

An increasingly strong interest in pseudoscience later alienated Campbell from Asimov. In the 1960s, Campbell's controversial essays supporting segregation, and other remarks and writings surrounding slavery and race, served to distance him from many in the science fiction community. Nevertheless, Campbell remained an important figure in science fiction publishing up until his death.  Campbell and Astounding shared one of the inaugural Hugo Awards with H. L. Gold and Galaxy at the 1953 World Science Fiction Convention. Subsequently, Campbell and Astounding won the Hugo Award for Best Professional Magazine seven times.

Shortly after his death in 1971, the University of Kansas science fiction program established the annual John W. Campbell Memorial Award for Best Science Fiction Novel and also renamed its annual Campbell Conference after him. The World Science Fiction Society established the annual John W. Campbell Award for Best New Writer, since renamed the Astounding Award for Best New Writer. The Science Fiction and Fantasy Hall of Fame inducted Campbell in 1996, in its inaugural class of two deceased and two living persons.

Biography 
John Campbell was born in Newark, New Jersey, in 1910. His father, John Wood Campbell Sr., was an electrical engineer. His mother, Dorothy (née Strahern) had an identical twin who visited them often and who disliked John. John was unable to tell them apart and says he was frequently rebuffed by the person he took to be his mother. Campbell attended the Blair Academy, a boarding school in rural Warren County, New Jersey, but did not graduate because of lack of credits for French and trigonometry.
He also attended, without graduating, the Massachusetts Institute of Technology (MIT), where he was befriended by the mathematician Norbert Wiener (who coined the term cybernetics) – but he failed German, and MIT dismissed him in his junior year in 1931. After two years at Duke University, he graduated with a Bachelor of Science in physics in 1934.

Campbell began writing science fiction at age 18 while attending MIT and sold his first stories quickly. From January 1930 to June 1931, Amazing Stories published six of his short stories, one novel, and six letters. Campbell was editor of Astounding Science Fiction (later called Analog Science Fiction and Fact) from late 1937 until his death. He stopped writing fiction after he became the editor of Astounding. Between December 11, 1957, and June 13, 1958, he hosted a weekly science fiction radio program called Exploring Tomorrow. The scripts were written by authors such as Gordon R. Dickson and Robert Silverberg.

Campbell and Doña Stewart married in 1931. They divorced in 1949, and he married Margaret (Peg) Winter in 1950. He spent most of his life in New Jersey and died of heart failure at his home in Mountainside, New Jersey. He was an atheist.

Writing career 

Editor T. O'Conor Sloane lost Campbell's first manuscript that he accepted for Amazing Stories, entitled "Invaders of the Infinite". "When the Atoms Failed" appeared in January 1930, followed by five more during 1930. Three were part of a space opera series featuring the characters Arcot, Morey, and Wade. A complete novel in the series, Islands of Space, was the cover story in the Spring 1931 Quarterly. During 1934–35 a serial novel, The Mightiest Machine, ran in Astounding Stories, edited by F. Orlin Tremaine, and several stories featuring lead characters Penton and Blake appeared from late 1936 in Thrilling Wonder Stories, edited by Mort Weisinger.

The early work for Amazing established Campbell's reputation as a writer of space adventure. When in 1934, he began to publish stories with a different tone he wrote as Don A. Stuart, a pseudonym derived from his wife's maiden name.

From 1930 until the later part of that decade, Campbell was prolific and successful under both names. Three significant stories published under the pseudonym are Twilight (Astounding, November 1934), Night (Astounding, October 1935), and Who Goes There? (Astounding, August 1938). Who Goes There?, about a group of Antarctic researchers who discover a crashed alien vessel, formerly inhabited by a malevolent shape-changing occupant, was published in Astounding almost a year after Campbell became its editor and it was his last significant piece of fiction, at age 28. It was filmed as The Thing from Another World (1951), The Thing (1982), and again as The Thing (2011).

Campbell held the amateur radio call sign W2ZGU, and wrote many articles on electronics and radio for a wide range of magazines.

Editing career 
Tremaine hired Campbell to succeed him as the editor of Astounding from its October 1937 issue. Campbell was not given full authority for Astounding until May 1938, but had been responsible for buying stories somewhat earlier. He began to make changes almost immediately, instigating a "mutant" label for unusual stories, and in March 1938, changing the title from Astounding Stories to Astounding Science-Fiction.

Lester del Rey's first story, in March 1938, was an early find for Campbell, and in 1939, he published such an extraordinary group of new writers for the first time that the period is generally regarded as the beginning of the "Golden Age of Science Fiction", and the July 1939 issue in particular. The July issue contained A. E. van Vogt's first story, "Black Destroyer", and Asimov's early story, "Trends"; August brought Robert A. Heinlein's first story, "Life-Line", and the next month Theodore Sturgeon's first story appeared.

Also in 1939, Campbell started the fantasy magazine Unknown (later Unknown Worlds). Although Unknown was canceled after only four years, a victim of wartime paper shortages, the magazine's editorial direction was significant in the evolution of modern fantasy.

Influence 
The Encyclopedia of Science Fiction wrote: "More than any other individual, he helped to shape modern sf", and Darrell Schweitzer credits him with having "decreed that SF writers should pull themselves up out of the pulp mire and start writing intelligently, for adults". After 1950, new magazines such as Galaxy Science Fiction and The Magazine of Fantasy & Science Fiction moved in different directions and developed talented new writers who were not directly influenced by him. Campbell often suggested story ideas to writers (including "Write me a creature that thinks as well as a man, or better than a man, but not like a man" ), and sometimes asked for stories to match cover paintings he had already bought.

Campbell had a strong formative influence on Asimov and eventually became a friend. Asimov said of Campbell's influence on the field: By his own example and by his instruction and by his undeviating and persisting insistence, he forced first Astounding and then all science fiction into his mold. He abandoned the earlier orientation of the field. He demolished the stock characters who had filled it; eradicated the penny dreadful plots; extirpated the Sunday-supplement science. In a phrase, he blotted out the purple of pulp. Instead, he demanded that science-fiction writers understand science and understand people, a hard requirement that many of the established writers of the 1930s could not meet. Campbell did not compromise because of that: those who could not meet his requirements could not sell to him, and the carnage was as great as it had been in Hollywood a decade before, while silent movies had given way to the talkies.

One example of the type of speculative but plausible science fiction that Campbell demanded from his writers is "Deadline", a short story by Cleve Cartmill that appeared during the wartime year of 1944, a year before the detonation of the first atomic bomb. As Ben Bova, Campbell's successor as editor at Analog, wrote, it "described the basic facts of how to build an atomic bomb. Cartmill and Campbell worked together on the story, drawing their scientific information from papers published in the technical journals before the war. To them, the mechanics of constructing a uranium-fission bomb seemed perfectly obvious." The FBI descended on Campbell's office after the story appeared in print and demanded that the issue be removed from the newsstands. Campbell convinced them that by removing the magazine "the FBI would be advertising to everyone that such a project existed and was aimed at developing nuclear weapons" and the demand was dropped.

Campbell was also responsible for the grim and controversial ending of Tom Godwin's short story "The Cold Equations". Writer Joe Green recounted that Campbell had three times sent 'Cold Equations' back to Godwin, before he got the version he wanted ... Godwin kept coming up with ingenious ways to save the girl! Since the strength of this deservedly classic story lies in the fact that the life of one young woman must be sacrificed to save the lives of many, it simply would not have the same impact if she had lived.

Between December 11, 1957, and June 13, 1958, Campbell hosted a weekly science fiction radio program called Exploring Tomorrow.

Views

Slavery, race, and segregation
Green wrote that Campbell "enjoyed taking the 'devil's advocate' position in almost any area, willing to defend even viewpoints with which he disagreed if that led to a livelier debate". As an example, he wrote:[Campbell] pointed out that the much-maligned 'peculiar institution' of slavery in the American South had in fact provided the blacks brought there with a higher standard of living than they had in Africa ... I suspected, from comments by Asimov, among others – and some Analog editorials I had read – that John held some racist views, at least in regard to blacks. Finally, however, Green agreed with Campbell that "rapidly increasing mechanization after 1850 would have soon rendered slavery obsolete anyhow. It would have been better for the USA to endure it a few more years than suffer the truly horrendous costs of the Civil War."

In a June 1961 editorial called "Civil War Centennial", Campbell argued that slavery had been a dominant form of human relationships for most of history and that the present was unusual in that anti-slavery cultures dominated the planet. He wrote, It's my bet that the South would have been integrated by 1910. The job would have been done – and done right – half a century sooner, with vastly less human misery, and with almost no bloodshed ... The only way slavery has ever been ended, anywhere, is by introducing industry ... If a man is a skilled and competent machinist – if the lathes work well under his hands – the industrial management will be forced, to remain in business, to accept that fact, whether the man be black, white, purple, or polka-dotted.

According to Michael Moorcock, Campbell suggested that some people preferred slavery. He also, when faced with the Watts riots of the mid-sixties, seriously proposed and went on to proposing that there were 'natural' slaves who were unhappy if freed. I sat on a panel with him in 1965, as he pointed out that the worker bee when unable to work dies of misery, that the moujiks when freed went to their masters and begged to be enslaved again, that the ideals of the anti-slavers who fought in the Civil War were merely expressions of self-interest and that the blacks were 'against' emancipation, which was fundamentally why they were indulging in 'leaderless' riots in the suburbs of Los Angeles.
 
In 1963, Campbell published an essay supporting segregated schools and arguing that "the Negro race" had failed to "produce super-high-geniuses". In 1965, he continued his defense of segregation and related practices, critiquing "the arrogant defiance of law by many of the Negro 'Civil Rights' groups". On February 10, 1967, Campbell rejected Samuel R. Delany's Nova a month before it was ultimately published, with a note and phone call to his agent explaining that he did not feel his readership "would be able to relate to a black main character".

Medicine and health 
Campbell was a critic of government regulation of health and safety, excoriating numerous public health initiatives and regulations.

Campbell was a heavy smoker throughout his life and was seldom seen without his customary cigarette holder. In the Analog of September 1964, nine months after the Surgeon General's first major warning about the dangers of cigarette smoking had been issued (January 11, 1964) Campbell ran an editorial, "A Counterblaste to Tobacco" that took its title from the anti-smoking book of the same name by King James I of England. In it, he stated that the connection to lung cancer was "esoteric" and referred to "a barely determinable possible correlation between cigarette smoking and cancer". He said that tobacco's calming effects led to more effective thinking. In a one-page piece about automobile safety in Analog dated May 1967, Campbell wrote of "people suddenly becoming conscious of the fact that cars kill more people than cigarettes do, even if the antitobacco alarmists were completely right..."

In 1963, Campbell published an angry editorial about Frances Oldham Kelsey who, while at the FDA, refused to permit thalidomide to be sold in the United States.

In other essays, Campbell supported crank medicine, arguing that government regulation was more harmful than beneficial and that regulating quackery prevented the use of many possible beneficial medicines (e.g., krebiozen).

Pseudoscience, parapsychology, and politics 
In the 1930s, Campbell became interested in Joseph Rhine's theories about ESP (Rhine had already founded the Parapsychology Laboratory at Duke University when Campbell was a student there), and over the following years his growing interest in parapsychology would be reflected in the stories he published when he encouraged the writers to include these topics in their tales, leading to the publication of numerous works about telepathy and other "psionic" abilities. This post-war "psi-boom" has been dated by science fiction scholars to roughly the mid-1950s to the early 1960s, and continues to influence many popular culture tropes and motifs.  Campbell rejected the Shaver Mystery in which the author claimed to have had a personal experience with a sinister ancient civilization that harbored fantastic technology in caverns under the earth.

His increasing beliefs in pseudoscience would eventually start to isolate and alienate him from some of his writers. He wrote favorably about such things as the "Dean drive", a device that supposedly produced thrust in violation of Newton's third law, and the "Hieronymus machine", which could supposedly amplify psi powers.

In 1949, Campbell worked closely with L. Ron Hubbard on the techniques that Hubbard later turned into Dianetics. When Hubbard's therapy failed to find support from the medical community, Campbell published the earliest forms of Dianetics in Astounding. He wrote of L. Ron Hubbard's initial article in Astounding that "[i]t is, I assure you in full and absolute sincerity, one of the most important articles ever published."

Campbell continued to promote Hubbard's theories until 1952, when the pair split acrimoniously over the direction of the movement.

Asimov wrote: "A number of writers wrote pseudoscientific stuff to ensure sales to Campbell, but the best writers retreated, I among them. ..." Elsewhere Asimov went on to further explain, Campbell championed far-out ideas ... He pained very many of the men he had trained (including me) in doing so, but felt it was his duty to stir up the minds of his readers and force curiosity right out to the border lines. He began a series of editorials ... in which he championed a social point of view that could sometimes be described as far right (he expressed sympathy for George Wallace in the 1968 national election, for instance).  There was bitter opposition to this from many (including me – I could hardly ever read a Campbell editorial and keep my temper).

Assessment by peers 
Damon Knight described Campbell as a "portly, bristled-haired blond man with a challenging stare". "Six-foot-one, with hawklike features, he presented a formidable appearance," said Sam Moskowitz. "He was a tall, large man with light hair, a beaky nose, a wide face with thin lips, and with a cigarette in a holder forever clamped between his teeth", wrote Asimov.

Algis Budrys wrote that "John W. Campbell was the greatest editor SF has seen or is likely to see, and is in fact one of the major editors in all English-language literature in the middle years of the twentieth century. All about you is the heritage of what he built".

Asimov said that Campbell was "talkative, opinionated, quicksilver-minded, overbearing. Talking to him meant listening to a monologue..." Knight agreed: "Campbell's lecture-room manner was so unpleasant to me that I was unwilling to face it. Campbell talked a good deal more than he listened, and he liked to say outrageous things."

British novelist and critic Kingsley Amis dismissed Campbell brusquely: "I might just add as a sociological note that the editor of Astounding, himself a deviant figure of marked ferocity, seems to think he has invented a psi machine."

Several science-fiction novelists have criticized Campbell as prejudiced – Samuel R. Delany for Campbell's rejection of a novel due to the black main character, and Joe Haldeman in the dedication of Forever Peace, for rejecting a novel due to a female soldier protagonist.

British science-fiction novelist Michael Moorcock, as part of his "Starship Stormtroopers" editorial, said Campbell's Stories and its writers were "wild-eyed paternalists to a man, fierce anti-socialists" with "[stories] full of crew-cut wisecracking, cigar-chewing, competent guys (like Campbell's image of himself)", who had success because their "work reflected the deep-seated conservatism of the majority of their readers, who saw a Bolshevik menace in every union meeting".  He viewed Campbell as turning the magazine into a vessel for right-wing politics, "by the early 1950s ... a crypto-fascist deeply philistine magazine pretending to intellectualism and offering idealistic kids an 'alternative' that was, of course, no alternative at all".

SF writer Alfred Bester, an editor of Holiday Magazine and a sophisticated Manhattanite, recounted at some length his "one demented meeting" with Campbell, a man he imagined from afar to be "a combination of Bertrand Russell and Ernest Rutherford". The first thing Campbell said to him was that Freud was dead, destroyed by the new discovery of Dianetics, which, he predicted, would win L. Ron Hubbard the Nobel Peace Prize. Campbell ordered the bemused Bester to "think back. Clear yourself. Remember! You can remember when your mother tried to abort you with a button hook. You've never stopped hating her for it." Bester commented: "It reinforced my private opinion that a majority of the science-fiction crowd, despite their brilliance, were missing their marbles."

Campbell died in 1971 at the age of 61 in Mountainside, New Jersey. At the time of his sudden death after 34 years at the helm of Analog, Campbell's quirky personality and eccentric editorial demands had alienated some of his most illustrious writers to the point that they no longer submitted works to him. After 1950, Theodore Sturgeon only published one story in Astounding but dozens in other magazines.

Asimov remained grateful for Campbell's early friendship and support. He dedicated The Early Asimov (1972) to him, and concluded it by stating that "There is no way at all to express how much he meant to me and how much he did for me except, perhaps, to write this book evoking, once more, those days of a quarter century ago". His final word on Campbell was that "in the last twenty years of his life, he was only a diminishing shadow of what he had once been." Even Heinlein, perhaps Campbell's most important discovery and a "fast friend", tired of him.

Poul Anderson wrote that Campbell "had saved and regenerated science fiction", which had become "the product of hack pulpsters" when he took over Astounding. "By his editorial policies and the help and encouragement he gave his writers (always behind the scenes), he raised both the literary and the intellectual standard anew. Whatever progress has been made stems from that renaissance".

Awards and honors
Shortly after Campbell's death, the University of Kansas science fiction program — now the Center for the Study of Science Fiction — established the annual John W. Campbell Memorial Award for Best Science Fiction Novel and also renamed after him its annual Campbell Conference. The World Science Fiction Society established the annual John W. Campbell Award for Best New Writer. All three memorials became effective in 1973. However, following Jeannette Ng's August 2019 acceptance speech of the award for Best New Writer at Worldcon 77, in which she criticized Campbell's politics and called him a fascist, the publishers of Analog magazine announced that the John W. Campbell Award for Best New Writer would immediately be renamed to "The Astounding Award for Best New Writer".

The Science Fiction and Fantasy Hall of Fame inducted Campbell in 1996, in its inaugural class of two deceased and two living persons.

Campbell and Astounding shared one of the inaugural Hugo Awards with H. L. Gold and Galaxy at the 1953 World Science Fiction Convention. Subsequently, he won the Hugo Award for Best Professional Magazine seven times to 1965. In 2018 he won a retrospective Hugo Award for Best Editor, Short Form (1943).

The Martian impact crater Campbell was named after him.

Works

This shortened bibliography lists each title once. Some titles that are duplicated are different versions, whereas other publications of Campbell's with different titles are simply selections from or retitlings of other works, and have hence been omitted. The main bibliographic sources are footnoted from this paragraph and provided much of the information in the following sections.

Novels
 Beyond the End of Space (1933)
 Conquest of the Planets (1935)
 The Mightiest Machine (1947) Aarn Munro #1
 The Incredible Planet (1949) Aarn Munro #2
 The Black Star Passes (1953) Arcot, Wade, Morey #1
 Islands of Space (1956)  Arcot, Wade, Morey #2
 Invaders from the Infinite (1961) Arcot, Wade, Morey #3
 The Ultimate Weapon (1966)

Short story collections and omnibus editions 
 Who Goes There? (1948)
 The Moon is Hell (1951)
 Cloak of Aesir (1952)
 The Planeteers (1966)
 The Best of John W. Campbell (1973)
 The Space Beyond (1976)
 The Best of John W. Campbell (1976) (Differs from 1973 version)
 A New Dawn: The Don A. Stuart Stories of John W. Campbell, Jr. (2003)

Edited books 
 From Unknown Worlds (1948)
 The Astounding Science Fiction Anthology (1952)
 Prologue to Analog (1962)
 Analog I (1963)
 Analog II (1964)
 Analog 3 (1965)
 Analog 4 (1966)
 Analog 5 (1967)
 Analog 6 (1968)
 Analog 7 (1969)
 Analog 8 (1971)

Nonfiction 
  Editorial Number Three: "Letter From the Editor", in A Requiem for Astounding (1964)
 Collected Editorials from Analog (1966)
 The John W. Campbell Letters, Volume 1 (1986)
 The John W. Campbell Letters with Isaac Asimov & A.E. van Vogt, Volume II (1993)
 Astounding: John W. Campbell, Isaac Asimov, Robert A. Heinlein, L. Ron Hubbard, and the Golden Age of Science Fiction, (2018) is a history of the era known as the golden age of science fiction shepherded by Campbell and a biography of Campbell himself written by Alec Nevala-Lee.

Memorial works 
Memorial works (Festschrift) include:

Further reading 
Marowski, Daniel G. and Stine, Jean C. “John W(ood) Campbell, Jr. (1910-1971).” Contemporary Literary Criticism. Vol. 32, 1985: 71-82 Literature Criticism Online. Web. November 2, 2011.

Nevala-Lee, Alec. "Astounding" 2018. Morrow/Dey Street.

See also

Notes

References 
Citations

Sources
 
 
  Reprinted in 
 
 
 
 
  Selected letters of Robert A. Heinlein
 
 
  Transcribed online at Challenger.

Further reading

External links

Audio

 John W. Campbell as host of the Mutual Broadcasting System's Exploring Tomorrow (1957–58)
John W. Campbell interviewed by Fred Lerner, 1962

Biography and criticism

 Astounding: The Campbell Years by Frederik Pohl
 "John W. Campbell, Jr." by Ben Bova, Analog June 2015 (thousandth issue)

Bibliography and works
 
 
 
 
 
 
 
 
 John Wood Campbell, Alpha Ralpha Boulevard
 

1910 births
1971 deaths
20th-century American male writers
20th-century American novelists
20th-century American short story writers
Amateur radio people
American atheists
American male novelists
American male short story writers
American science fiction writers
American speculative fiction editors
Analog Science Fiction and Fact people
Blair Academy alumni
Duke University alumni
Hugo Award-winning editors
Hugo Award-winning writers
Massachusetts Institute of Technology alumni
Novelists from New Jersey
People from Mountainside, New Jersey
Pulp fiction writers
Science fiction editors
Science Fiction Hall of Fame inductees
Street & Smith
Unknown (magazine)
Writers from Newark, New Jersey